Rawdon is a municipality located on the Ouareau River in southwestern Quebec, Canada, about 60 kilometres north of Montreal. It is the seat for the Regional County Municipality of Matawinie, in the Lanaudière region. Rawdon is part of the Joliette federal electoral district.

The town of Rawdon is a mostly French-speaking tourist resort and is home to one English public school and four French public schools as well as a medium-size ski resort.

Geography 

Rawdon is located at the beginning of the Canadian Shield mountains.  Its lakes and mountains make it a destination for summer tourism with its many camps and cottages.  Rawdon is home to the Dorwin and Manchester falls, which lie less than a kilometre from downtown and offer a public beach on the artificial Rawdon Lake.  In summer, temperatures can soar as high as  while temperatures as cold as  can be felt in winter.

History 

The township was established in 1799 and named after Sir Francis Rawdon-Hastings, 1st Marquess of Hastings. The town was primarily home to people of Irish background up until 1844, when more and more French-Canadians settled the region and small shops and industries emerged. After the First World War and the October Revolution, Rawdon saw a considerable number of Russian, Ukrainian, and Belorussian noble families arrive to settle in its countryside from the Polish–Lithuanian Commonwealth. Rawdon was originally part of Montcalm County. From 1920 to 1998, there were two separate municipalities named "Rawdon," the Township of Rawdon and the Village of Rawdon; in 1998, they were united into a single municipality.On November 8, 2021, former pro wrestler Raymond Rougeau was elected mayor.

Demographics

Population

In summer, the population is said to double and even sometimes triple due to tourism and the presence of many cottages in the vicinity.

Private dwellings occupied by usual residents: 4532 (total dwellings: 5422)

Language
Mother tongue:
 English as first language: 8.8%
 French as first language: 85.7%
 English and French as first language: 2.2%
 Other as first language: 3.2%

Education

Commission scolaire des Samares operates francophone public schools.
 École Ste-Anne (primary)
 École St-Louis (primary)
 École secondaire des Chutes (secondary)

Sir Wilfrid Laurier School Board operates anglophone public schools:
 Rawdon Elementary School
 Joliette Elementary School
 Joliette High School in Joliette

Notable people 
 Martin Deschamps, singer
 Firmin Dugas (1830-1889), businessman and politician
 Jonathan Girard, former Boston Bruins hockey player
 Jean-Paul Jeannotte (1926–2021), operatic tenor, academic teacher and opera administrator

See also
List of municipalities in Quebec
Canadiana Village

References

External links 
 Official Municipality Website
 A brief history of Rawdon
 Rawdon Historical Society

Municipalities in Quebec
Incorporated places in Lanaudière
Matawinie Regional County Municipality